Monolene is a genus of small, mainly deepwater lefteye flounders from the Atlantic and East Pacific.

Species
The currently recognized species in this genus are:
 Monolene antillarum Norman, 1933 (slim flounder)
 Monolene asaedai H. W. Clark, 1936 (Asaedae flounder)
 Monolene atrimana Goode & T. H. Bean, 1886
 Monolene danae Bruun, 1937
 Monolene dubiosa Garman, 1899 (Acapulco flounder)
 Monolene helenensis Amaoka & Imamura, 2000
 Monolene maculipinna Garman, 1899 (Pacific deepwater flounder)
 Monolene megalepis Woods, 1961
 Monolene mertensi (Poll, 1959) (Merten's moonflounder)
 Monolene microstoma Cadenat, 1937 (smallmouth moonflounder)
 Monolene sessilicauda Goode, 1880 (deepwater flounder)

References

Bothidae
Marine fish genera
Taxa named by George Brown Goode